Morum praeclarum is a species of sea snail, a marine gastropod mollusk in the family Harpidae, the harp snails.

Description

Distribution
Deep water, western Indian Ocean.

References

Harpidae